Tyler Martin (born 28 June 1990) is a water polo player of Australia. He was part of the Australian team at the  2015 World Aquatics Championships and the 2016 Summer Olympics.

References

External links
 

Australian male water polo players
Living people
Place of birth missing (living people)
1990 births
Olympic water polo players of Australia
Water polo players at the 2016 Summer Olympics
Canadian emigrants to Australia